Newry is a civil parish in County Armagh and County Down, Northern Ireland. It is situated in the historic baronies of Iveagh Upper, Lower Half (one townland) and Lordship of Newry in County Down and the baronies of Orior Upper and Oneilland West (two townlands) in County Armagh.

Settlements
The townland contains the following settlements:
Newry

Townlands
Newry civil parish contains the following townlands:

Altnaveigh
Ardarragh
Ballinlare
Ballyholland Lower
Ballyholland Upper
Ballynacraig
Benagh
Carnacally
Carnbane
Carneyhough
Carnmeen
Castle Enigan
Cloghanramer
Commons
Corcreeghy
Creeve
Crobane
Croreagh
Curley
Damolly
Derry Beg
Derry More
Derryboy
Derryleckagh
Desert
Drumalane
Drumcashellone
Edenmore
Fathom Lower
Fathom Upper
Finnard
Grange Lower
Grange Upper
Gransha
Greenan
Lisdrumgullion
Lisdrumliska
Lisduff
Lisnaree
Lisserboy
Loughorne
Ouley
Ryan
Saval Beg
Saval More
Shannaghan
Sheeptown
Shinn
Turmore

See also
List of civil parishes of County Down

References

 
Newry